Phanom Set is a tambon (subdistrict) of Tha Tako District, Nakhon Sawan Province.

History
Phanom Set separated from Phanom Rok in 1933. Its named "Phanom Set" after a mountain named "Khao Phanom Set" that stands prominently in the middle of the area.

Geography
Phanom Set has a mostly flat terrain with Khao Phanom Set located in the middle of the area. In the rainy season, agricultural areas will be flooded and some villages in the dry season will lack water for farming.

Adjacent subdistricts are (from the north clockwise): Wang Yai in its district and Phai Sing in Chum Saeng District, Phanom Rok in its district, Wang Mahakon in its district, Thap Krit in Chum Saeng District.

Administration
Phanom Set is governed by the Subdistrict Administrative Organization (SAO) Phanom Set (อบต.พนมเศษ).

The area also consists of 11 administrative villages (muban).

The emblem of SAO Phanom Set shows a Khao Phanom Set along with the ears of rice adorned as a frame.

Demography
It has a total population of 5,036 people (2,432 men, 2,604 women) in 1,793 households.

Economy
Most of the people in Phanom Set are engaged in agriculture, followed by employed.

Watermelon is an important local product.

Utilities
Phanom Set has electricity for all 11 villages (except for some areas outside the electric service area using solar power). While tap water is only available in some villages (Ban Phanom Set Tai, Ban Khro Riangrai, Ban Hua Prik, Ban Khlong Khut).

There are four gas stations in total.

Places
Wat Phanom Set Tai
Wat Phanom Set Nuea
Khao Phanom Set Scenic Viewpoint
Guanyin Shrine

References

Tambon of Nakhon Sawan Province